Olivier Chastel (born 22 November 1964, in Liège) is a Belgian pharmacist and politician of the Liberal Party "Mouvement Réformateur" (MR) who has been serving as a Member of the European Parliament since 2019.

Early life and education
After finishing his studies at the Athénée Royal in Charleroi in 1982, Chastel graduated in Pharmacy at the Université Libre de Bruxelles in 1987. For some years, he subsequently worked as a research assistant at the Analytical Chemistry Department at the Pharmacy Institute (ULB).  He was a scientific collaborator of the Analysis Laboratory Quality Assistance in Thuin, where he once was head of department and became a specialist in Quality Assurance.

Political career

Early beginnings
In 1998, Chastel scaled back his professional activities and became involved with local politics, combining this new challenge with his passion for tennis and for breeding the Flanders Cattle Dog "Bouvier des Flandres".

Since 1993, Chastel has been a city councillor in Charleroi and in 1998, he joined the Parliament of Wallonia, in substitution for Étienne Knoops.

Member of the Belgian Parliament, 1999–2019
A few months later, Chastel headed the liberal list for the Chamber of Representatives in the Charleroi – Thuin district. In the 1999 Belgian federal election, he obtained 12,000 votes and started his federal career. During his time in parliament, he served on the Committee on Infrastructure and in the SABENA inquiry. As the President of the Petitions Commission, he supported the tasks of the Federal Ombudsmen, charged with the simplification of the relations between the authorities and citizens. In the 2003 elections, Chastel obtained 22,133 preferential votes in the canton of Hainaut and became Vice-President of the Chamber of Representatives.

From February until July 2004, Chastel briefly held the position of Minister of Arts, Literature and Audiovisual Matters in the French Community of Belgium.

On the city level, Chastel obtained more than 17,000 votes in the 2006 local elections.

In the 2007 Belgian federal election, Chastel also headed the list for the Chamber of Representatives for the canton of Hainaut. At this occasion, the MR obtained 199,859 votes in the canton of Hainaut, which was a gain of 40,000 votes compared to 2003. The votes increased by 5% and 27%, which is the largest score the MR had ever reached in the Hainaut. But these exceptional results also allowed the MR to win a sixth seat in the Chamber of Representatives. Chastel, for his part, tripled his score of 2003. With his 67,180 preferential votes, he obtained the second best score for the MR in the Chamber.

On 20 March 2008, Chastel was appointed State Secretary for European Affairs in the government of Prime Minister Herman Van Rompuy. In the 2009 European elections, he was the 3rd on the list led by Louis Michel; he obtained 74,616 preferential votes but did not get a seat in the European Parliament.

In the 2010 elections, Chastel was confirmed as a representative in the Chamber of Representatives. After a successful Belgian presidency of the Council of the European Union, he was appointed by Prime Minister Yves Leterme as Minister of Development Cooperation, charged with European Affairs, in February 2011. He succeeded Charles Michel who was elected as President of the Mouvement Réformateur.

From 2011 until 2014, Chastel served as Minister for Budget and Administrative Simplification in the government of Prime Minister Elio Di Rupo.

Member of the European Parliament, 2019–present
Since the 2019 European Parliament election, Chastel has been one of the vice-chairs of the Parliament’s Committee on Budgets. In this capacity, he served as his parliamentary group’s lead negotiator on the budget of the European Union for 2022. He is also a member of the Committee on Economic and Monetary Affairs. 

In addition to his committee assignments, Chastel is part of the Parliament’s delegations for relations with the Maghreb countries and the Arab Maghreb Union as well as to the Parliamentary Assembly of the Union for the Mediterranean. He is also a member of the European Parliament Intergroup on Artificial Intelligence and Digital, the European Parliament Intergroup on Children’s Rights, the European Parliament Intergroup on LGBT Rights, the European Parliament Intergroup on Small and Medium-Sized Enterprises (SMEs), and the Spinelli Group.

Overview 

1988–1993 : acting city councillor in Charleroi
 Since 1993 : city councillor in Charleroi
 December 2006 - May 2007: 1st alderman in Charleroi (economics, work, markets and social economy).
 1991–1995 : acting representative for Daniel DUCARME (Chamber – Charleroi district)
 1995–1998 : 1st acting representative for Etienne KNOOPS (Walloon Parliament – Charleroi district)
 1998–1999 : Representative for the French Community and the Walloon Parliament (Charleroi district)
 1999 - June 2003 : Federal Representative (Charleroi – Thuin district)
 June 2003 - February 2004 : Federal Representative (Hainaut), Vice-President of the Chamber of Representatives
 February 2004 - July 2004 : Minister of Arts, Literature and Audiovisual matters in the French community government Wallonia-Brussels
 July 2004 - March 2008 : Federal Representative (Hainaut), Vice-President of the Chamber of Representatives, and of the Commission : Infrastructure, Communications and Public Enterprises
 March 2008 : State Secretary for European Affairs
 Since February 2011 : Minister of Development Cooperation, charged with European Affairs

Recognition
 Knight in the Order of Leopold since June 2007 (A.R. 05-06-2007)
 Knight in the Order of the Cross of Terra Mariana of the Republic of Estonia since June 2008
 Commander in the Order of Leopold II since June 2010 (A.R. 06-06-2010)
 Middle Cross with the star in the Order of Merit of the Republic of Hungary since September 2011
 Grand-Cross in the Order of Civil Merit of the Kingdom of Spain since September 2011

References

External links

 Personal website of Olivier Chastel
 Website of the Minister for Budget and Administrative simplification

1964 births
Living people
Politicians from Liège
Reformist Movement politicians
Government ministers of Belgium
Recipients of the Order of the Cross of Terra Mariana, 1st Class
Commanders of the Order of Leopold II
Recipients of the Order of Merit of the Republic of Hungary
21st-century Belgian politicians
MEPs for Belgium 2019–2024
Belgian pharmacists